Impelsys develops digital platforms for publishers of e-books and academic journals and learning management system for education providers. The company also specializes in creating bespoke e-learning content. The company was founded in 2001 and is headquartered in New York. Impelsys' information technology operations are based in Bangalore, India.

History
Impelsys was founded in 2001 by Sameer Shariff. Initially the company worked for textbook publishers, scanning hard copies and producing compact discs to accompany textbooks. In 2003, Impelsys incorporated and initiated a content transformation service for Elsevier. That same year Impelsys also started offering ancillary content services for the publishing industry.

Though the initial services offering centered around content engineering, in 2004, the company started developing web applications for the publishing industry. A few years later, Impelsys came up with a content delivery platform that allowed publishers to deploy their content on their own white labeled content delivery platforms. In 2009, Impelsys launched iPublishCentral. The platform is updated regularly to keep pace with the evolving publishing industry.

Corporate affairs

Leadership 
Impelsys is managed by CEO and Founder, Sameer Shariff.

Other key executives are:

 Vinod Kumar T V, Chief Operating Officer
 Deepak Kaushik, Chief Financial Officer
 Mike Davis, Executive Vice President - Strategy & Transformation
 Uday Majithia, Vice President - Solutions and Service Delivery
 Vinod Sundaresan, Vice President - Technology Services
 Vipin Chandran, Vice President - Head of Business Unit, Heart Bangalore
 Puneet Agrawal, Vice President - Europe Sales
 Bharat Bhosale, Vice President - Americas Sales
 George Oommen, Vice President - Learning and Content Services
 Swaroop Chandra BS, Vice President - Marketing and Communications
 Vishwanath Bannur, Vice President - IT and CISO
 Kavitha Nandagopal, Vice President - Human Resources and Talent Acquisition

Clients 
Impelsys has a customer base of over 200 publishers globally. MIT Press, Wolters Kluwer and Sesame Street were early adopters of iPublishCentral. Other major clients include McGraw-Hill Education, HarperCollins, and Encyclopædia Britannica, Inc.

See also
 Tech companies in the New York metropolitan area

References

Further reading
 
 
 

Publishing companies based in New York City
Software companies based in New York City
Companies established in 2001
Software companies of the United States